Although Costa Rica is a small country, it is in the bird-rich neotropical region and has a huge number of species for its area. The official bird list published by the Costa Rican Rare Birds and Records Committee of the Asociación Ornitológica de Costa Rica (AOCR) contained 945 species as of July 2022.  

Of those species, seven are endemic (three of which are found only on Cocos Island), 90 are rare or accidental, and four have been introduced by humans. Another 73 are near-endemic with ranges that include only Costa Rica and Panama. Twenty-seven species, including five of the seven endemics, are globally vulnerable or endangered. Over an area of 51,100 km2, an area smaller than West Virginia, this is the greatest density of bird species of any continental American country. About 600 species are resident, with most of the other regular visitors being winter migrants from North America.

Costa Rica's geological formation played a large role in the diversification of avian species. North America and South America were initially separate continents, but millions of years of earthquakes and volcanic eruptions eventually fused the two continents together. When this happened, species from the north and south poured into the land bridge that became Central America. Birds like the hummingbird came from the south, while birds like the jay came from the north.

Part of the diversity stems from the wide array of habitats, which include mangrove swamps along the Pacific coast, the wet Caribbean coastal plain in the northeast, dry northern Pacific lowlands, and multiple mountain chains that form the spine of the country and rise as high as 3,500 m. These mountain chains, the largest of which is the Cordillera de Talamanca, form a geographical barrier that has enabled closely related but different species to develop on either side of the chain. A good example of this speciation is the white-collared manakin of the Caribbean side, which is now distinct from the orange-collared manakin of the Pacific slope.

In the past, higher sea levels left the mountains as highlands, and isolation again led to distinct species developing, with over thirty now endemic to the mountains, especially the Talamanca range which extends from southern Costa Rica into Panama.

This list is presented in the taxonomic sequence of the Check-list of North and Middle American Birds, 7th edition through the 63rd Supplement, published by the American Ornithological Society (AOS). Common and scientific names are also those of the Check-list, except that the common names of families are from the Clements taxonomy because the AOS list does not include them.

Unless otherwise noted, all species on the list are considered to occur regularly in Costa Rica as permanent residents, summer or winter visitors, or migrants. The following tags have been used to highlight certain categories of occurrence:

 (A) Accidental - a species that rarely or accidentally occurs in Costa Rica
 (R?) Residence uncertain - a species which might be resident
 (E) Endemic - a species endemic to Costa Rica
 (E-R) Regional endemic - a species found only in Costa Rica and Panama
 (I) Introduced - a species introduced to Costa Rica as a consequence, direct or indirect, of human actions

Tinamous

Order: TinamiformesFamily: Tinamidae

The tinamous are one of the most ancient groups of birds. Although they look similar to other ground-dwelling birds like quail and grouse, they have no close relatives and are classified as a single family, Tinamidae, within their own order, the Tinamiformes. They are distantly related to the ratites (order Struthioniformes) which includes the rheas, emu, and kiwis.

 Highland tinamou, Nothocercus bonapartei
 Great tinamou, Tinamus major
 Little tinamou, Crypturellus soui
 Thicket tinamou, Crypturellus cinnamomeus
 Slaty-breasted tinamou, Crypturellus boucardi

Ducks, geese, and waterfowl

Order: AnseriformesFamily: Anatidae

Anatidae includes the ducks and most duck-like waterfowl, such as geese and swans. These birds are adapted to an aquatic existence with webbed feet, flattened bills, and feathers that are excellent at shedding water due to an oily coating.

 White-faced whistling-duck, Dendrocygna viduata (R?)
 Black-bellied whistling-duck, Dendrocygna autumnalis
 Fulvous whistling-duck, Dendrocygna bicolor
 Greater white-fronted goose, Anser albifrons (A)
 Comb duck, Sarkidiornis silvicola (A)
 Orinoco goose, Oressochen jubatus (A)
 Muscovy duck, Cairina moschata
 Blue-winged teal, Spatula discors
 Cinnamon teal, Spatula cyanoptera
 Northern shoveler, Spatula clypeata
 American wigeon, Mareca americana
 Mallard, Anas platyrhynchos
 White-cheeked pintail, Anas bahamensis (A)
 Northern pintail, Anas acuta
 Green-winged teal, Anas crecca
 Canvasback, Aythya valisineria (A)
 Redhead, Aythya americana (A)
 Ring-necked duck, Aythya collaris
 Greater scaup, Aythya marila (A)
 Lesser scaup, Aythya affinis
 Hooded merganser, Lophodytes cucullatus (A)
 Red-breasted Merganser, Mergus serrator (A)
 Masked duck, Nomonyx dominicus
 Ruddy duck, Oxyura jamaicensis (A)

Guans, chachalacas, and curassows

Order: GalliformesFamily: Cracidae

The Cracidae are large birds, similar in general appearance to turkeys. The guans and curassows live in trees, but the smaller chachalacas are found in more open scrubby habitats. They are generally dull-plumaged, but the curassows and some guans have colorful facial ornaments.

 Plain chachalaca, Ortalis vetula
 Gray-headed chachalaca, Ortalis cinereiceps
 Crested guan, Penelope purpurascens
 Black guan, Chamaepetes unicolor (E-R)
 Great curassow, Crax rubra (vulnerable)

New World quail

Order: GalliformesFamily: Odontophoridae

The New World quail are small, plump terrestrial birds only distantly related to the quails of the Old World, but named for their similar appearance and habits.

 Tawny-faced quail, Rhynchortyx cinctus
 Buffy-crowned wood-partridge, Dendrortyx leucophrys
 Crested bobwhite, Colinus cristatus
 Marbled wood-quail, Odontophorus gujanensis
 Black-eared wood-quail, Odontophorus melanotis
 Black-breasted wood-quail, Odontophorus leucolaemus (E-R)
 Spotted wood-quail, Odontophorus guttatus

Grebes
Order: PodicipediformesFamily: Podicipedidae

Grebes are small to medium-large freshwater diving birds. They have lobed toes and are excellent swimmers and divers. However, they have their feet placed far back on the body, making them quite ungainly on land.

 Least grebe, Tachybaptus dominicus
 Pied-billed grebe, Podilymbus podiceps
 Eared grebe, Podiceps nigricollis (A)

Pigeons and doves

Order: ColumbiformesFamily: Columbidae

Pigeons and doves are stout-bodied birds with short necks and short slender bills with a fleshy cere.

 Rock pigeon, Columba livia (I)
 Pale-vented pigeon, Patagioenas cayennensis
 Scaled pigeon, Patagioenas speciosa
 White-crowned pigeon, Patagioenas leucocephala (A)
 Red-billed pigeon, Patagioenas flavirostris
 Band-tailed pigeon, Patagioenas fasciata
 Ruddy pigeon, Patagioenas subvinacea
 Short-billed pigeon, Patagioenas nigrirostris
 Eurasian collared-dove, Streptopelia decaocto (I) (A) (R?)
 Inca dove, Columbina inca
 Common ground dove, Columbina passerina
 Plain-breasted ground dove, Columbina minuta
 Ruddy ground dove, Columbina talpacoti
 Blue ground dove, Claravis pretiosa
 Maroon-chested ground dove, Paraclaravis mondetoura
 Ruddy quail-dove, Geotrygon montana
 Violaceous quail-dove, Geotrygon violacea
 Olive-backed quail-dove, Leptotrygon veraguensis
 White-tipped dove, Leptotila verreauxi
 Gray-chested dove, Leptotila cassinii
 Gray-headed dove, Leptotila plumbeiceps
 Buff-fronted quail-dove, Zentrygon costaricensis (E-R)
 Purplish-backed quail-dove, Zentrygon lawrencii (E-R)
 Chiriqui quail-dove, Zentrygon chiriquensis
 White-winged dove, Zenaida asiatica
 Eared dove, Zenaida auriculata (A)
 Mourning dove, Zenaida macroura

Cuckoos

Order: CuculiformesFamily: Cuculidae

The family Cuculidae includes cuckoos, roadrunners, and anis. These birds are of variable size with slender bodies, long tails, and strong legs. The Old World cuckoos are brood parasites.

 Greater ani, Crotophaga major (A)
 Smooth-billed ani, Crotophaga ani
 Groove-billed ani, Crotophaga sulcirostris
 Striped cuckoo, Tapera naevia
 Pheasant cuckoo, Dromococcyx phasianellus
 Lesser ground-cuckoo, Morococcyx erythropygus
 Rufous-vented ground-cuckoo, Neomorphus geoffroyi
 Squirrel cuckoo, Piaya cayana
 Yellow-billed cuckoo, Coccyzus americanus
 Mangrove cuckoo, Coccyzus minor (R?)
 Cocos cuckoo, Coccyzus ferrugineus (E) (vulnerable)
 Black-billed cuckoo, Coccyzus erythropthalmus

Nightjars and allies
Order: CaprimulgiformesFamily: Caprimulgidae

Nightjars are medium-sized nocturnal birds that usually nest on the ground. They have long wings, short legs, and very short bills. Most have small feet, of little use for walking, and long pointed wings. Their soft plumage is camouflaged to resemble bark or leaves.

 Short-tailed nighthawk, Lurocalis semitorquatus
 Lesser nighthawk, Chordeiles acutipennis
 Common nighthawk, Chordeiles minor
 Common pauraque, Nyctidromus albicollis
 Ocellated poorwill, Nyctiphrynus ocellatus
 Chuck-will's-widow, Antrostomus carolinensis
 Rufous nightjar, Antrostomus rufus
 Buff-collared nightjar, Antrostomus ridgwayi (A)
 Eastern whip-poor-will, Antrostomus vociferus
 Dusky nightjar, Antrostomus saturatus (E-R)
 White-tailed nightjar, Hydropsalis cayennensis

Oilbird
Order: SteatornithiformesFamily: Steatornithidae

The oilbird is a slim, long-winged bird distantly related to the nightjars. It is nocturnal and a specialist feeder on the fruit of the oil palm.

 Oilbird, Steatornis caripensis

Potoos

Order: NyctibiiformesFamily: Nyctibiidae

The potoos (sometimes called poor-me-ones) are large near passerine birds related to the nightjars and frogmouths. They are nocturnal insectivores which lack the bristles around the mouth found in the true nightjars.

 Great potoo, Nyctibius grandis
 Common potoo, Nyctibius griseus
 Northern potoo, Nyctibius jamaicensis

Swifts
Order: ApodiformesFamily: Apodidae

Swifts are small birds which spend the majority of their lives flying. These birds have very short legs and never settle voluntarily on the ground, perching instead only on vertical surfaces. Many swifts have long swept-back wings which resemble a crescent or boomerang.

 Black swift, Cypseloides niger (vulnerable)
 White-chinned swift, Cypseloides cryptus
 Spot-fronted swift, Cypseloides cherriei
 Chestnut-collared swift, Streptoprocne rutila
 White-collared swift, Streptoprocne zonaris
 Gray-rumped swift, Chaetura cinereiventris
 Costa Rican swift, Chaetura fumosa (E-R)
 Chimney swift, Chaetura pelagica (vulnerable)
 Vaux's swift, Chaetura vauxi
 Lesser swallow-tailed swift, Panyptila cayennensis
 Great swallow-tailed swift, Panyptila sanctihieronymi (A)

Hummingbirds
Order: ApodiformesFamily: Trochilidae

Hummingbirds are small birds capable of hovering in mid-air due to the rapid flapping of their wings. They are the only birds that can fly backwards.

 White-necked jacobin, Florisuga mellivora
 White-tipped sicklebill, Eutoxeres aquila
 Bronzy hermit, Glaucis aeneus
 Band-tailed barbthroat, Threnetes ruckeri
 Green hermit, Phaethornis guy
 Long-billed hermit, Phaethornis longirostris
 Stripe-throated hermit, Phaethornis striigularis
 Green-fronted lancebill, Doryfera ludovicae
 Brown violetear, Colibri delphinae
 Mexican violetear, Colibri thalassinus  (A)
 Lesser violetear, Colibri cyanotus 
 Purple-crowned fairy, Heliothryx barroti
 Green-breasted mango, Anthracothorax prevostii
 Veraguan mango, Anthracothorax veraguensis (R?)
 Green thorntail, Discosura conversii
 Rufous-crested coquette, Lophornis delattrei (A)
 Black-crested coquette, Lophornis helenae
 White-crested coquette, Lophornis adorabilis (E-R)
 Green-crowned brilliant, Heliodoxa jacula
 Rivoli's hummingbird, Eugenes fulgens (A)
 Talamanca hummingbird, Eugenes spectabilis (E-R)
 Fiery-throated hummingbird, Panterpe insignis (E-R)
 Long-billed starthroat, Heliomaster longirostris
 Plain-capped starthroat, Heliomaster constantii
 White-bellied mountain-gem, Lampornis hemileucus (E-R)
 Purple-throated mountain-gem, Lampornis calolaemus
 White-throated mountain-gem, Lampornis castaneoventris (E-R)
 Magenta-throated woodstar, Philodice bryantae (E-R)
 Ruby-throated hummingbird, Archilochus colubris
 Volcano hummingbird, Selasphorus flammula (E-R)
 Scintillant hummingbird, Selasphorus scintilla (E-R)
 Canivet's emerald, Cynanthus canivetii
 Garden emerald, Chlorostilbon assimilis (E-R)
 Violet-headed hummingbird, Klais guimeti
 Violet sabrewing, Campylopterus hemileucurus
 Bronze-tailed plumeleteer, Chalybura urochrysia
 Crowned woodnymph, Thalurania colombica
 Snowcap, Microchera albocoronata (E-R)
 Coppery-headed emerald, Microchera cupreiceps (E)
 White-tailed emerald, Microchera chionura (E-R)
 Stripe-tailed hummingbird, Eupherusa eximia
 Black-bellied hummingbird, Eupherusa nigriventris (E-R)
 Scaly-breasted hummingbird, Phaeochroa cuvierii
 Blue-vented hummingbird, Saucerottia hoffmanni
 Blue-tailed hummingbird, Saucerottia cyanura
 Snowy-bellied hummingbird, Saucerottia edward (E-R)
 Cinnamon hummingbird, Amazilia rutila
 Rufous-tailed hummingbird, Amazilia tzacatl
 Mangrove hummingbird, Amazilia boucardi (E) (endangered)
 Sapphire-throated hummingbird, Chrysuronia coeruleogularis
 Blue-chested hummingbird, Polyerata amabilis
 Charming hummingbird, Polyerata decora (E-R)
 White-bellied emerald, Chlorestes candida (R?)
 Blue-throated goldentail, Chlorestes eliciae

Rails, gallinules, and coots
Order: GruiformesFamily: Rallidae

Rallidae is a large family of small to medium-sized birds which includes the rails, crakes, coots, and gallinules. Typically they inhabit dense vegetation in damp environments near lakes, swamps, or rivers. In general they are shy and secretive birds, making them difficult to observe. Most species have strong legs and long toes which are well adapted to soft uneven surfaces. They tend to have short, rounded wings and to be weak fliers.

 Paint-billed crake, Mustelirallus erythrops
 Spotted rail, Pardirallus maculatus
 Uniform crake, Amaurolimnas concolor
 Rufous-necked wood-rail, Aramides axillaris
 Russet-naped wood-rail, Aramides albiventris
 Gray-cowled wood-rail, Aramides cajaneus
 Mangrove rail, Rallus longirostris
 Clapper rail, Rallus crepitans (A)
 Colombian crake, Mustelirallus colombianus (A)
 Sora, Porzana carolina
 Common gallinule, Gallinula galeata
 American coot, Fulica americana
 Purple gallinule, Porphyrio martinicus
 Ocellated crake, Micropygia schomburgkii
 Yellow-breasted crake, Hapalocrex flaviventer
 Ruddy crake, Laterallus ruber (R?)
 White-throated crake, Laterallus albigularis
 Gray-breasted crake, Laterallus exilis
 Black rail, Laterallus jamaicensis (R?)

Finfoots
Order: GruiformesFamily: Heliornithidae

Heliornithidae is a small family of tropical birds with webbed lobes on their feet similar to those of grebes and coots.

 Sungrebe, Heliornis fulica

Limpkin
Order: GruiformesFamily: Aramidae

The limpkin resembles a large rail. It has drab-brown plumage and a grayer head and neck.

 Limpkin, Aramus guarauna

Thick-knees
Order: CharadriiformesFamily: Burhinidae

The thick-knees are a group of largely tropical waders in the family Burhinidae. They are found worldwide within the tropical zone, with some species also breeding in temperate Europe and Australia. They are medium to large waders with strong black or yellow-black bills, large yellow eyes, and cryptic plumage. Despite being classed as waders, most species have a preference for arid or semi-arid habitats.

 Double-striped thick-knee, Burhinus bistriatus

Stilts and avocets

Order: CharadriiformesFamily: Recurvirostridae

Recurvirostridae is a family of large wading birds which includes the avocets and stilts. The avocets have long legs and long up-curved bills. The stilts have extremely long legs and long, thin, straight bills.

 Black-necked stilt, Himantopus mexicanus
 American avocet, Recurvirostra americana

Oystercatchers
Order: CharadriiformesFamily: Haematopodidae

The oystercatchers are large and noisy plover-like birds with strong bills used for smashing or prying open molluscs.

 American oystercatcher, Haematopus palliatus

Plovers and lapwings
Order: CharadriiformesFamily: Charadriidae

The family Charadriidae includes the plovers, dotterels, and lapwings. They are small to medium-sized birds with compact bodies, short thick necks, and long, usually pointed, wings. They are found in open country worldwide, mostly in habitats near water.

 Southern lapwing, Vanellus chilensis
 Black-bellied plover, Pluvialis squatarola
 American golden-plover, Pluvialis dominica
 Pacific golden-plover, Pluvialis fulva (A)
 Killdeer, Charadrius vociferus
 Semipalmated plover, Charadrius semipalmatus
 Piping plover, Charadrius melodus (A)
 Wilson's plover, Charadrius wilsonia
 Collared plover, Charadrius collaris
 Snowy plover, Charadrius nivosus

Jacanas
Order: CharadriiformesFamily: Jacanidae

The jacanas are a family of waders which are found throughout the tropics. They are identifiable by their huge feet and claws which enable them to walk on floating vegetation in the shallow lakes that are their preferred habitat.

 Northern jacana, Jacana spinosa
 Wattled jacana, Jacana jacana (A)

Sandpipers and allies
Order: CharadriiformesFamily: Scolopacidae

Scolopacidae is a large diverse family of small to medium-sized shorebirds including the sandpipers, curlews, godwits, shanks, tattlers, woodcocks, snipes, dowitchers, and phalaropes. The majority of these species eat small invertebrates picked out of the mud or soil. Variation in length of legs and bills enables multiple species to feed in the same habitat, particularly on the coast, without direct competition for food.

 Upland sandpiper, Bartramia longicauda
 Whimbrel, Numenius phaeopus
 Long-billed curlew, Numenius americanus
 Eskimo curlew, Numenius borealis (exterpated)
 Hudsonian godwit, Limosa haemastica
 Marbled godwit, Limosa fedoa
 Ruddy turnstone, Arenaria interpres
 Red knot, Calidris canutus
 Surfbird, Calidris virgata
 Ruff, Calidris pugnax
 Stilt sandpiper, Calidris himantopus
 Curlew sandpiper, Calidris ferruginea
 Sanderling, Calidris alba
 Dunlin, Calidris alpina
 Baird's sandpiper, Calidris bairdii
 Least sandpiper, Calidris minutilla
 White-rumped sandpiper, Calidris fuscicollis
 Buff-breasted sandpiper, Calidris subruficollis
 Pectoral sandpiper, Calidris melanotos
 Semipalmated sandpiper, Calidris pusilla
 Western sandpiper, Calidris mauri
 Short-billed dowitcher, Limnodromus griseus
 Long-billed dowitcher, Limnodromus scolopaceus
 Wilson's snipe, Gallinago delicata
 Spotted sandpiper, Actitis macularius
 Solitary sandpiper, Tringa solitaria
 Wandering tattler, Tringa incana
 Lesser yellowlegs, Tringa flavipes
 Willet, Tringa semipalmata
 Greater yellowlegs, Tringa melanoleuca
 Wilson's phalarope, Phalaropus tricolor
 Red-necked phalarope, Phalaropus lobatus
 Red phalarope, Phalaropus fulicarius

Skuas and jaegers
Order: CharadriiformesFamily: Stercorariidae

The family Stercorariidae are, in general, medium to large birds, typically with gray or brown plumage, often with white markings on the wings. They nest on the ground in temperate and arctic regions and are long-distance migrants.

 South polar skua, Stercorarius maccormicki (A)
 Pomarine jaeger, Stercorarius pomarinus 
 Parasitic jaeger, Stercorarius parasiticus
 Long-tailed jaeger, Stercorarius longicaudus (A)

Gulls, terns, and skimmers
Order: CharadriiformesFamily: Laridae

Laridae is a family of medium to large seabirds and includes gulls, kittiwakes, terns, and skimmers. They are typically gray or white, often with black markings on the head or wings. They have longish bills and webbed feet. Terns are a group of generally medium to large seabirds typically with gray or white plumage, often with black markings on the head. Most terns hunt fish by diving but some pick insects off the surface of fresh water. Terns are generally long-lived birds, with several species known to live in excess of 30 years. Skimmers are a small family of tropical tern-like birds. They have an elongated lower mandible which they use to feed by flying low over the water surface and skimming the water for small fish.

 Swallow-tailed gull, Creagrus furcatus
 Black-legged kittiwake, Rissa tridactyla (A) (vulnerable)
 Sabine's gull, Xema sabini
 Bonaparte's gull, Chroicocephalus philadelphia (A)
 Gray-hooded gull, Chroicocephalus cirrocephalus (A)
 Gray gull, Leucophaeus modestus (A)
 Laughing gull, Leucophaeus atricilla
 Franklin's gull, Leucophaeus pipixcan
 Belcher's gull, Larus belcheri (A)
 Heermann's gull, Larus heermanni (A)
 Ring-billed gull, Larus delawarensis
 Western gull, Larus occidentalis (A)
 California gull, Larus californicus (A)
 Herring gull, Larus argentatus
 Lesser black-backed gull, Larus fuscus (A)
 Great black-backed gull, Larus marinus (A)
 Kelp gull, Larus dominicanus (A)
 Brown noddy, Anous stolidus
 Black noddy, Anous minutus
 White tern, Gygis alba 
 Sooty tern, Onychoprion fuscatus
 Bridled tern, Onychoprion anaethetus
 Least tern, Sternula antillarum
 Yellow-billed Tern, Sternula superciliaris (A)
 Large-billed tern, Phaetusa simplex (A)
 Gull-billed tern, Gelochelidon nilotica
 Caspian tern, Hydroprogne caspia
 Inca tern, Larosterna inca (A)
 Black tern, Chlidonias niger
 Roseate tern, Sterna dougallii (A)
 Common tern, Sterna hirundo
 Arctic tern, Sterna paradisaea
 Forster's tern, Sterna forsteri
 Royal tern, Thalasseus maximus
 Sandwich tern, Thalasseus sandvicensis
 Elegant tern, Thalasseus elegans
 Black skimmer, Rynchops niger

Sunbittern

Order: EurypygiformesFamily: Eurypygidae

The sunbittern is a bittern-like bird of tropical regions of the Americas and the sole member of the family Eurypygidae (sometimes spelled Eurypigidae) and genus Eurypyga.

 Sunbittern, Eurypyga helias

Tropicbirds
Order: PhaethontiformesFamily: Phaethontidae

Tropicbirds are slender white birds of tropical oceans which have exceptionally long central tail feathers. Their heads and long wings have black markings.

 White-tailed tropicbird, Phaethon lepturus (A)
 Red-billed tropicbird, Phaethon aethereus
 Red-tailed tropicbird, Phaethon rubricauda (A)

Albatrosses
Order: ProcellariiformesFamily: Diomedeidae

The albatrosses are among the largest of flying birds, and the great albatrosses from the genus Diomedea have the largest wingspans of any extant birds.

 Waved albatross, Phoebastria irrorata (A) (critically endangered)
 Yellow-nosed albatross, Thalassarche chlororhynchos (A) (endangered)

Southern storm-petrels
Order: ProcellariiformesFamily: Oceanitidae

The storm-petrels are the smallest seabirds, relatives of the petrels, feeding on planktonic crustaceans and small fish picked from the surface, typically while hovering. The flight is fluttering and sometimes bat-like. Until 2018, this family's three species were included with the other storm-petrels in family Hydrobatidae.

 Wilson's storm-petrel, Oceanites oceanicus (A)
 White-faced storm-petrel, Pelagodroma marina (A)
 White-bellied storm-petrel, Fregetta grallaria (A)

Northern storm-petrels
Order: ProcellariiformesFamily: Hydrobatidae

Though the members of this family are similar in many respects to the southern storm-petrels, including their general appearance and habits, there are enough genetic differences to warrant their placement in a separate family.

 Leach's storm-petrel, Hydrobates leucorhous (vulnerable)
 Band-rumped storm-petrel, Hydrobates castro (A)
 Wedge-rumped storm-petrel, Hydrobates tethys
 Black storm-petrel, Hydrobates melania
 Markham's storm-petrel, Hydrobates markhami
 Least storm-petrel, Hydrobates microsoma

Shearwaters and petrels
Order: ProcellariiformesFamily: Procellariidae

The procellariids are the main group of medium-sized "true petrels", characterized by united nostrils with medium septum and a long outer functional primary.

 Black-capped petrel, Pterodroma hasitata (A)
 Galapagos petrel, Pterodroma phaeopygia (A) (critically endangered)
 Tahiti petrel, Pterodroma rostrata
 Spectacled petrel, Procellaria conspicillata (A) (vulnerable)
 Parkinson's petrel, Procellaria parkinsoni (vulnerable)
 Cory's shearwater, Calonectris diomedea (A)
 Wedge-tailed shearwater, Ardenna pacifica
 Short-tailed shearwater, Ardenna tenuirostris
 Sooty shearwater, Ardenna grisea
 Great shearwater, Ardenna gravis (A)
 Pink-footed shearwater, Ardenna creatopus (vulnerable)
 Christmas shearwater, Puffinus nativitatis (A)
 Galapagos shearwater, Puffinus subalaris
 Manx shearwater, Puffinus puffinus (A)
 Black-vented shearwater, Puffinus opisthomelas (A)
 Audubon's shearwater, Puffinus lherminieri

Storks

Order: CiconiiformesFamily: Ciconiidae

Storks are large, long-legged, long-necked wading birds with long, stout bills. Storks are mute, but bill-clattering is an important mode of communication at the nest. Their nests can be large and may be reused for many years. Many species are migratory.

 Maguari stork, Ciconia maguari (A)
 Jabiru, Jabiru mycteria
 Wood stork, Mycteria americana

Frigatebirds

Order: SuliformesFamily: Fregatidae

Frigatebirds are large seabirds usually found over tropical oceans. They are large, black-and-white or completely black, with long wings and deeply forked tails. The males have colored inflatable throat pouches. They do not swim or walk and cannot take off from a flat surface. Having the largest wingspan-to-body-weight ratio of any bird, they are essentially aerial, able to stay aloft for more than a week.

 Magnificent frigatebird, Fregata magnificens
 Great frigatebird, Fregata minor

Boobies and gannets
Order: SuliformesFamily: Sulidae

The sulids comprise the gannets and boobies. Both groups are medium to large coastal seabirds that plunge-dive for fish.

 Masked booby, Sula dactylatra
 Nazca booby, Sula granti (R?)
 Blue-footed booby, Sula nebouxii
 Peruvian booby, Sula variegata (A)
 Brown booby, Sula leucogaster
 Red-footed booby, Sula sula

Anhingas
Order: SuliformesFamily: Anhingidae

Anhingas are often called "snake-birds" because of their long thin neck, which gives a snake-like appearance when they swim with their bodies submerged. The males have black and dark-brown plumage, an erectile crest on the nape, and a larger bill than the female. The females have much paler plumage especially on the neck and underparts. The anhingas have completely webbed feet and their legs are short and set far back on the body. Their plumage is somewhat permeable, like that of cormorants, and they spread their wings to dry after diving.

 Anhinga, Anhinga anhinga

Cormorants and shags
Order: SuliformesFamily: Phalacrocoracidae

Phalacrocoracidae is a family of medium to large coastal, fish-eating seabirds that includes cormorants and shags. Plumage coloration varies, with the majority having mainly dark plumage, some species being black-and-white, and a few being colorful.

 Neotropic cormorant, Nannopterum brasilianum

Pelicans
Order: PelecaniformesFamily: Pelecanidae

Pelicans are large water birds with a distinctive pouch under their beak. As with other members of the order Pelecaniformes, they have webbed feet with four toes.

 American white pelican, Pelecanus erythrorhynchos (A)
 Brown pelican, Pelecanus occidentalis

Herons, egrets, and bitterns

Order: PelecaniformesFamily: Ardeidae

The family Ardeidae contains the bitterns, herons, and egrets. Herons and egrets are medium to large wading birds with long necks and legs. Bitterns tend to be shorter necked and more wary. Members of Ardeidae fly with their necks retracted, unlike other long-necked birds such as storks, ibises and spoonbills.

 Pinnated bittern, Botaurus pinnatus
 American bittern, Botaurus lentiginosus
 Least bittern, Ixobrychus exilis
 Rufescent tiger-heron, Tigrisoma lineatum
 Fasciated tiger-heron, Tigrisoma fasciatum
 Bare-throated tiger-heron, Tigrisoma mexicanum
 Great blue heron, Ardea herodias
 Great egret, Ardea alba
 Whistling heron, Syrigma sibilatrix (A) (R?)
 Snowy egret, Egretta thula
 Little blue heron, Egretta caerulea
 Tricolored heron, Egretta tricolor
 Reddish egret, Egretta rufescens
 Cattle egret, Bubulcus ibis
 Green heron, Butorides virescens
 Striated heron, Butorides striata (A)
 Agami heron, Agamia agami (vulnerable)
 Black-crowned night-heron, Nycticorax nycticorax
 Yellow-crowned night-heron, Nyctanassa violacea
 Boat-billed heron, Cochlearius cochlearius

Ibises and spoonbills
Order: PelecaniformesFamily: Threskiornithidae

Threskiornithidae is a family of large terrestrial and wading birds which includes the ibises and spoonbills. They have long, broad wings with 11 primary and about 20 secondary feathers. They are strong fliers and despite their size and weight, very capable soarers.

 White ibis, Eudocimus albus
 Glossy ibis, Plegadis falcinellus
 White-faced ibis, Plegadis chihi (A)
 Green ibis, Mesembrinibis cayennensis
 Bare-faced ibis, Phimosus infuscatusM (A)
 Roseate spoonbill, Platalea ajaja

New World vultures

Order: CathartiformesFamily: Cathartidae

The New World vultures are not closely related to Old World vultures, but superficially resemble them because of convergent evolution. Like the Old World vultures, they are scavengers. However, unlike Old World vultures, which find carcasses by sight, New World vultures have a good sense of smell with which they locate carrion.

 King vulture, Sarcoramphus papa
 Black vulture, Coragyps atratus
 Turkey vulture, Cathartes aura
 Lesser yellow-headed vulture, Cathartes burrovianus

Osprey
Order: AccipitriformesFamily: Pandionidae

The family Pandionidae contains only one species, the osprey. The osprey is a medium-large raptor which is a specialist fish-eater with a worldwide distribution.

 Osprey, Pandion haliaetus

Hawks, eagles, and kites

Order: AccipitriformesFamily: Accipitridae

Accipitridae is a family of birds of prey, which includes hawks, eagles, kites, harriers, and Old World vultures. These birds have powerful hooked beaks for tearing flesh from their prey, strong legs, powerful talons, and keen eyesight.

 Pearl kite, Gampsonyx swainsonii
 White-tailed kite, Elanus leucurus
 Hook-billed kite, Chondrohierax uncinatus
 Gray-headed kite, Leptodon cayanensis
 Swallow-tailed kite, Elanoides forficatus
 Crested eagle, Morphnus guianensis
 Harpy eagle, Harpia harpyja
 Black hawk-eagle, Spizaetus tyrannus
 Black-and-white hawk-eagle, Spizaetus melanoleucus
 Ornate hawk-eagle, Spizaetus ornatus
 Double-toothed kite, Harpagus bidentatus
 Northern harrier, Circus hudsonius
 Gray-bellied hawk, Accipiter poliogaster (R?)
 Tiny hawk, Accipiter superciliosus
 Sharp-shinned hawk, Accipiter striatus
 Cooper's hawk, Accipiter cooperii
 Bicolored hawk, Accipiter bicolor
 Mississippi kite, Ictinia mississippiensis
 Black-collared hawk, Busarellus nigricollis
 Crane hawk, Geranospiza caerulescens
 Snail kite, Rostrhamus sociabilis
 Plumbeous hawk, Cryptoleucopteryx plumbea
 Common black hawk, Buteogallus anthracinus
 Savanna hawk, Buteogallus meridionalis
 Great black hawk, Buteogallus urubitinga
 Solitary eagle, Buteogallus solitarius
 Barred hawk, Morphnarchus princeps
 Roadside hawk, Rupornis magnirostris
 Harris's hawk, Parabuteo unicinctus
 White-tailed hawk, Geranoaetus albicaudatus
 White hawk, Pseudastur albicollis
 Semiplumbeous hawk, Leucopternis semiplumbeus
 Gray hawk, Buteo plagiatus
 Gray-lined hawk, Buteo nitidus
 Broad-winged hawk, Buteo platypterus
 Short-tailed hawk, Buteo brachyurus
 Swainson's hawk, Buteo swainsoni
 Zone-tailed hawk, Buteo albonotatus
 Red-tailed hawk, Buteo jamaicensis

Barn-owls
Order: StrigiformesFamily: Tytonidae

Barn-owls are medium to large owls with large heads and characteristic heart-shaped faces. They have long strong legs with powerful talons.

 Barn owl, Tyto alba

Owls

Order: StrigiformesFamily: Strigidae

The typical owls are small to large solitary nocturnal birds of prey. They have large forward-facing eyes and ears, a hawk-like beak, and a conspicuous circle of feathers around each eye called a facial disk.

 Bare-shanked screech-owl, Megascops clarkii
 Tropical screech-owl, Megascops choliba
 Pacific screech-owl, Megascops cooperi
 Middle-American screech-owl, Megascops guatemalae
 Choco screech-owl, Megascops centralis
 Crested owl, Lophostrix cristata
 Spectacled owl, Pulsatrix perspicillata
 Great horned owl, Bubo virginianus
 Costa Rican pygmy-owl, Glaucidium costaricanum (E-R)
 Central American pygmy-owl, Glaucidium griseiceps
 Ferruginous pygmy-owl, Glaucidium brasilianum
 Burrowing owl, Athene cunicularia (A)
 Mottled owl, Strix virgata
 Black-and-white owl, Strix nigrolineata
 Short-eared owl, Asio flammeus (A)
 Striped owl, Asio clamator
 Unspotted saw-whet owl, Aegolius ridgwayi

Trogons

Order: TrogoniformesFamily: Trogonidae

The family Trogonidae includes trogons and quetzals. Found in tropical woodlands worldwide, they feed on insects and fruit, and their broad bills and weak legs reflect their diet and arboreal habits. Although their flight is fast, they are reluctant to fly any distance. Trogons have soft, often colorful, feathers with distinctive male and female plumage.

 Lattice-tailed trogon, Trogon clathratus (E-R)
 Slaty-tailed trogon, Trogon massena
 Black-headed trogon, Trogon melanocephalus
 Baird's trogon, Trogon bairdii (E-R)
 Gartered trogon, Trogon caligatus
 Black-throated trogon, Trogon rufus
 Elegant trogon, Trogon elegans
 Collared trogon, Trogon collaris
 Resplendent quetzal, Pharomachrus mocinno

Motmots

Order: CoraciiformesFamily: Momotidae

The motmots have colorful plumage and long, graduated tails which they display by waggling back and forth. In most of the species, the barbs near the ends of the two longest (central) tail feathers are weak and fall off, leaving a length of bare shaft and creating a racket-shaped tail.

 Tody motmot, Hylomanes momotula
 Lesson's motmot, Momotus lessonii
 Rufous motmot, Baryphthengus martii
 Keel-billed motmot, Electron carinatum (vulnerable)
 Broad-billed motmot, Electron platyrhynchum
 Turquoise-browed motmot, Eumomota superciliosa

Kingfishers
Order: CoraciiformesFamily: Alcedinidae

Kingfishers are medium-sized birds with large heads, long, pointed bills, short legs, and stubby tails.

 Ringed kingfisher, Megaceryle torquatus
 Belted kingfisher, Megaceryle alcyon
 Amazon kingfisher, Chloroceryle amazona
 American pygmy kingfisher, Chloroceryle aenea
 Green kingfisher, Chloroceryle americana
 Green-and-rufous kingfisher, Chloroceryle inda

Puffbirds
Order: PiciformesFamily: Bucconidae

The puffbirds are related to the jacamars and have the same range, but lack the iridescent colors of that family. They are mainly brown, rufous, or gray, with large heads and flattened bills with hooked tips. The loose abundant plumage and short tails makes them look stout and puffy, giving rise to the English common name of the family.

 White-necked puffbird, Notharchus hyperrhynchus
 Pied puffbird, Notharchus tectus
 White-whiskered puffbird, Malacoptila panamensis
 Lanceolated monklet, Micromonacha lanceolata
 White-fronted nunbird, Monasa morphoeus

Jacamars
Order: PiciformesFamily: Galbulidae

The jacamars are near passerine birds from tropical South America, with a range that extends up to Mexico. They feed on insects caught on the wing, and are glossy, elegant birds with long bills and tails. In appearance and behavior they resemble the Old World bee-eaters, although they are more closely related to puffbirds.

 Rufous-tailed jacamar, Galbula ruficauda
 Great jacamar, Jacamerops aureus

New World barbets
Order: PiciformesFamily: Capitonidae

The barbets are plump birds, with short necks and large heads. They get their name from the bristles which fringe their heavy bills. Most species are brightly colored.

 Red-headed barbet, Eubucco bourcierii

Toucan-barbets
Order: PiciformesFamily: Semnornithidae

The toucan-barbets are birds of montane forests in the Neotropics. They are highly social and non-migratory.

 Prong-billed barbet, Semnornis frantzii (E-R)

Toucans

Order: PiciformesFamily: Ramphastidae

Toucans are near passerine birds from the Neotropics. They are brightly marked and have enormous, colorful bills which in some species amount to half their body length.

 Northern emerald-toucanet, Aulacorhynchus prasinus
 Collared aracari, Pteroglossus torquatus
 Fiery-billed aracari, Pteroglossus frantzii (E-R)
 Yellow-eared toucanet, Selenidera spectabilis
 Keel-billed toucan, Ramphastos sulfuratus
 Yellow-throated toucan, Ramphastos ambiguus

Woodpeckers

Order: PiciformesFamily: Picidae

Woodpeckers are small to medium-sized birds with chisel-like beaks, short legs, stiff tails, and long tongues used for capturing insects. Some species have feet with two toes pointing forward and two backward, while several species have only three toes. Many woodpeckers have the habit of tapping noisily on tree trunks with their beaks.

 Olivaceous piculet, Picumnus olivaceus
 Acorn woodpecker, Melanerpes formicivorus
 Golden-naped woodpecker, Melanerpes chrysauchen (E-R)
 Black-cheeked woodpecker, Melanerpes pucherani
 Red-crowned woodpecker, Melanerpes rubricapillus
 Hoffmann's woodpecker, Melanerpes hoffmannii
 Yellow-bellied sapsucker, Sphyrapicus varius
 Smoky-brown woodpecker, Drobates fumigatus
 Hairy woodpecker, Picoides villosus
 Red-rumped woodpecker, Veniliornis kirkii
 Rufous-winged woodpecker, Piculus simplex (E-R)
 Golden-olive woodpecker, Colaptes rubiginosus
 Cinnamon woodpecker, Celeus loricatus
 Chestnut-colored woodpecker, Celeus castaneus
 Lineated woodpecker, Dryocopus lineatus
 Pale-billed woodpecker, Campephilus guatemalensis

Falcons and caracaras

Order: FalconiformesFamily: Falconidae

Falconidae is a family of diurnal birds of prey. They differ from hawks, eagles, and kites in that they kill with their beaks instead of their talons.

 Laughing falcon, Herpetotheres cachinnans
 Barred forest-falcon, Micrastur ruficollis
 Slaty-backed forest-falcon, Micrastur mirandollei
 Collared forest-falcon, Micrastur semitorquatus
 Red-throated caracara, Ibycter americanus
 Crested caracara, Caracara plancus
 Yellow-headed caracara, Milvago chimachima
 American kestrel, Falco sparverius
 Merlin, Falco columbarius
 Aplomado falcon, Falco femoralis
 Bat falcon, Falco rufigularis
 Orange-breasted falcon, Falco deiroleucus (R?)
 Peregrine falcon, Falco peregrinus

New World and African parrots

Order: PsittaciformesFamily: Psittacidae

Parrots are small to large birds with a characteristic curved beak. Their upper mandibles have slight mobility in the joint with the skull and they have a generally erect stance. All parrots are zygodactyl, having the four toes on each foot placed two at the front and two to the back.

 Sulphur-winged parakeet, Pyrrhura hoffmanni (E-R)
 Olive-throated parakeet, Eupsittula nana
 Orange-fronted parakeet, Eupsittula canicularis
 Brown-throated parakeet, Eupsittula pertinax
 Scarlet macaw, Ara macao
 Great green macaw, Ara ambigua (endangered)
 Crimson-fronted parakeet, Psittacara finschi
 Barred parakeet, Bolborhynchus lineola
 Orange-chinned parakeet, Brotogeris jugularis
 Red-fronted parrotlet, Touit costaricensis (E-R) (vulnerable)
 Brown-hooded parrot, Pyrilia haematotis
 Blue-headed parrot, Pionus menstruus
 White-crowned parrot, Pionus senilis
 White-fronted parrot, Amazona albifrons
 Red-lored parrot, Amazona autumnalis
 Mealy parrot, Amazona farinosa
 Yellow-naped parrot, Amazona auropalliata (endangered)
 Yellow-crowned Parrot, Amazona ochrocephala (A)

Manakins

Order: PasseriformesFamily: Pipridae

The manakins are a family of subtropical and tropical mainland Central and South America, and Trinidad and Tobago. They are compact forest birds, the males typically being brightly colored, although the females of most species are duller and usually green-plumaged. Manakins feed on small fruits, berries, and insects.

 Lance-tailed manakin, Chiroxiphia lanceolata
 Long-tailed manakin, Chiroxiphia linearis
 White-ruffed manakin, Corapipo altera
 White-bibbed manakin, Corapipo leucorrhoa (A)
 Blue-crowned manakin, Lepidothrix coronata
 White-collared manakin, Manacus candei
 Orange-collared manakin, Manacus aurantiacus (E-R)
 White-crowned manakin, pseudopipra pipra
 Red-capped manakin, Ceratopipra mentalis

Cotingas
Order: PasseriformesFamily: Cotingidae

The cotingas are birds of forests or forest edges in tropical South America. Comparatively little is known about this diverse group, although all have broad bills with hooked tips, rounded wings, and strong legs. The males of many of the species are brightly colored or decorated with plumes or wattles.

 Purple-throated fruitcrow, Querula purpurata
 Bare-necked umbrellabird, Cephalopterus glabricollis (E-R) (endangered)
 Lovely cotinga, Cotinga amabilis
 Turquoise cotinga, Cotinga ridgwayi (E-R) (vulnerable)
 Rufous piha, Lipaugus unirufus
 Three-wattled bellbird, Procnias tricarunculata (vulnerable)
 Yellow-billed cotinga, Carpodectes antoniae (E-R) (endangered)
 Snowy cotinga, Carpodectes nitidus

Tityras and allies

Order: PasseriformesFamily: Tityridae

Tityridae are suboscine passerine birds found in forest and woodland in the Neotropics. The species in this family were formerly spread over the families Tyrannidae, Pipridae, and Cotingidae. They are small to medium-sized birds. They do not have the sophisticated vocal capabilities of the songbirds. Most, but not all, have plain coloring.

 Northern schiffornis, Schiffornis veraepacis
 Speckled mourner, Laniocera rufescens
 Masked tityra, Tityra semifasciata
 Black-crowned tityra, Tityra inquisitor
 Barred becard, Pachyramphus versicolor
 Cinnamon becard, Pachyramphus cinnamomeus
 White-winged becard, Pachyramphus polychopterus
 Black-and-white becard, Pachyramphus albogriseus
 Rose-throated becard, Pachyramphus aglaiae

Royal flycatcher and allies
Order: PasseriformesFamily: Onychorhynchidae

The members of this small family, created in 2018, were formerly considered to be tyrant flycatchers, family Tyrannidae.

 Sharpbill, Oxyruncus cristatus
 Royal flycatcher, Onychorhynchus coronatus
 Ruddy-tailed flycatcher, Terenotriccus erythrurus
 Sulphur-rumped flycatcher, Myiobius sulphureipygius
 Black-tailed flycatcher, Myiobius atricaudus

Tyrant flycatchers

Order: PasseriformesFamily: Tyrannidae

Tyrant flycatchers are passerine birds which occur throughout North and South America. They superficially resemble the Old World flycatchers, but are more robust and have stronger bills. They do not have the sophisticated vocal capabilities of the songbirds. Most, but not all, have plain coloring. As the name implies, most are insectivorous.

 Gray-headed piprites, Piprites griseiceps
 Stub-tailed spadebill, Platyrinchus cancrominus
 White-throated spadebill, Platyrinchus mystaceus
 Golden-crowned spadebill, Platyrinchus coronatus
 Olive-striped flycatcher, Mionectes olivaceus
 Ochre-bellied flycatcher, Mionectes oleagineus
 Sepia-capped flycatcher, Leptopogon amaurocephalus
 Slaty-capped flycatcher, Leptopogon superciliaris
 Rufous-browed tyrannulet, Phylloscartes superciliaris
 Black-capped pygmy-tyrant, Myiornis atricapillus
 Scale-crested pygmy-tyrant, Lophotriccus pileatus
 Northern bentbill, Oncostoma cinereigulare
 Slate-headed tody-flycatcher, Poecilotriccus sylvia
 Common tody-flycatcher, Todirostrum cinereum
 Black-headed tody-flycatcher, Todirostrum nigriceps
 Eye-ringed flatbill, Rhynchocyclus brevirostris
 Yellow-olive flycatcher, Tolmomyias sulphurescens
 Yellow-margined flycatcher, Tolmomyias assimilis
 Yellow-bellied tyrannulet, Ornithion semiflavum
 Brown-capped tyrannulet, Ornithion brunneicapillus
 Northern beardless-tyrannulet, Camptostoma imberbe
 Southern beardless-tyrannulet, Camptostoma obsoletum
 Cocos flycatcher, Nesotriccus ridgwayi (E) (vulnerable)
 Mouse-colored tyrannulet, Nesotriccus murinus
 Yellow tyrannulet, Capsiempis flaveola
 Yellow-crowned tyrannulet, Tyrannulus elatus
 Greenish elaenia, Myiopagis viridicata
 Yellow-bellied elaenia, Elaenia flavogaster
 Lesser elaenia, Elaenia chiriquensis
 Mountain elaenia, Elaenia frantzii
 Torrent tyrannulet, Serpophaga cinerea
 Rough-legged tyrannulet, Phyllomyias burmeisteri
 Mistletoe tyrannulet, Zimmerius parvus
 Bright-rumped attila, Attila spadiceus
 Rufous mourner, Rhytipterna holerythra
 Dusky-capped flycatcher, Myiarchus tuberculifer
 Panama flycatcher, Myiarchus panamensis
 Ash-throated flycatcher, Myiarchus cinerascens (A)
 Nutting's flycatcher, Myiarchus nuttingi
 Great crested flycatcher, Myiarchus crinitus
 Brown-crested flycatcher, Myiarchus tyrannulus
 Great kiskadee, Pitangus sulphuratus
 Boat-billed flycatcher, Megarynchus pitangua
 Rusty-margined flycatcher, Myiozetetes cayanensis
 Social flycatcher, Myiozetetes similis
 Gray-capped flycatcher, Myiozetetes granadensis
 White-ringed flycatcher, Conopias albovittatus
 Golden-bellied flycatcher, Myiodynastes hemichrysus (E-R)
 Golden-crowned flycatcher, Myiodynastes chrysocephalus (A)
 Streaked flycatcher, Myiodynastes maculatus
 Sulphur-bellied flycatcher, Myiodynastes luteiventris
 Piratic flycatcher, Legatus leucophaius
 Tropical kingbird, Tyrannus melancholicus
 Couch's kingbird, Tyrannus couchii (A)
 Western kingbird, Tyrannus verticalis
 Eastern kingbird, Tyrannus tyrannus
 Gray kingbird, Tyrannus dominicensis
 Scissor-tailed flycatcher, Tyrannus forficatus
 Fork-tailed flycatcher, Tyrannus savana
 Bran-colored flycatcher, Myiophobus fasciatus
 Tawny-chested flycatcher, Aphanotriccus capitalis (vulnerable)
 Tufted flycatcher, Mitrephanes phaeocercus
 Olive-sided flycatcher, Contopus cooperi
 Dark pewee, Contopus lugubris (E-R)
 Ochraceous pewee, Contopus ochraceus (E-R)
 Western wood-pewee, Contopus sordidulus (R?)
 Eastern wood-pewee, Contopus virens
 Tropical pewee, Contopus cinereus
 Yellow-bellied flycatcher, Empidonax flaviventris
 Acadian flycatcher, Empidonax virescens
 Alder flycatcher, Empidonax alnorum
 Willow flycatcher, Empidonax traillii
 White-throated flycatcher, Empidonax albigularis
 Least flycatcher, Empidonax minimus
 Yellowish flycatcher, Empidonax flavescens
 Black-capped flycatcher, Empidonax atriceps (E-R)
 Black phoebe, Sayornis nigricans
 Eastern phoebe, Sayornis phoebe (A)
 Vermilion flycatcher, Pyrocephalus rubinus (A)
 Northern scrub-flycatcher, Sublegatus arenarum
 Long-tailed tyrant, Colonia colonus

Gnateaters
Order: PasseriformesFamily: Conopophagidae

The members of this small family are found across northern South America and into Central America. They are forest birds, usually seen on the ground or in the low understory.

 Black-crowned antpitta, Pittasoma michleri

Typical antbirds

Order: PasseriformesFamily: Thamnophilidae

The antbirds are a large family of small passerine birds of subtropical and tropical Central and South America. They are forest birds which tend to feed on insects at or near the ground. A sizable minority of them specialize in following columns of army ants to eat small invertebrates that leave their hiding places to flee from the ants. Many species lack bright color, with brown, black, and white being the dominant tones.

 Fasciated antshrike, Cymbilaimus lineatus
 Great antshrike, Taraba major
 Barred antshrike, Thamnophilus doliatus
 Black-hooded antshrike, Thamnophilus bridgesi (E-R)
 Black-crowned antshrike, Thamnophilus atrinucha
 Russet antshrike, Thamnistes anabatinus
 Plain antvireo, Dysithamnus mentalis
 Streak-crowned antvireo, Dysithamnus striaticeps
 Spot-crowned antvireo, Dysithamnus puncticeps
 White-flanked antwren, Myrmotherula axillaris
 Slaty antwren, Myrmotherula schisticolor
 Checker-throated stipplethroat, Epinecrophylla fulviventris
 Dot-winged antwren, Microrhopias quixensis
 Rufous-rumped antwren, Euchrepomis callinota
 Dusky antbird, Cercomacroides tyrannina
 Bare-crowned antbird, Gymnocichla nudiceps
 Zeledon's antbird, Hafferia zeledoni
 Chestnut-backed antbird, Poliocrania exsul
 Dull-mantled antbird, Sipia laemosticta
 Spotted antbird, Hylophylax naevioides
 Bicolored antbird, Gymnopithys bicolor
 Ocellated antbird, Phaenostictus mcleannani

Antpittas
Order: PasseriformesFamily: Grallariidae

Antpittas resemble the true pittas with strong, longish legs, very short tails, and stout bills.

 Scaled antpitta, Grallaria guatimalensis
 Streak-chested antpitta, Hylopezus perspicillatus
 Thicket antpitta, Hylopezus dives
 Ochre-breasted antpitta, Grallaricula flavirostris

Tapaculos
Order: PasseriformesFamily: Rhinocryptidae

The tapaculos are small suboscine passeriform birds with numerous species in South and Central America. They are terrestrial species that fly only poorly on their short wings. They have strong legs, well-suited to their habitat of grassland or forest undergrowth. The tail is cocked and pointed towards the head.

 Silvery-fronted tapaculo, Scytalopus argentifrons (E-R)

Antthrushes
Order: PasseriformesFamily: Formicariidae

Antthrushes resemble small rails with strong, longish legs, very short tails, and stout bills.

 Black-faced antthrush, Formicarius analis
 Black-headed antthrush, Formicarius nigricapillus
 Rufous-breasted antthrush, Formicarius rufipectus

Ovenbirds and woodcreepers

Order: PasseriformesFamily: Furnariidae

Ovenbirds comprise a large family of small sub-oscine passerine bird species found in Central and South America. They are a diverse group of insectivores which gets its name from the elaborate "oven-like" clay nests built by some species, although others build stick nests or nest in tunnels or clefts in rock. The woodcreepers are brownish birds which maintain an upright vertical posture supported by their stiff tail vanes. They feed mainly on insects taken from tree trunks.

 Middle American leaftosser, Sclerurus mexicanus
 Gray-throated leaftosser, Sclerurus albigularis
 Scaly-throated leaftosser, Sclerurus guatemalensis
 Olivaceous woodcreeper, Sittasomus griseicapillus
 Long-tailed woodcreeper, Deconychura longicauda
 Ruddy woodcreeper, Dendrocincla homochroa
 Tawny-winged woodcreeper, Dendrocincla anabatina
 Plain-brown woodcreeper, Dendrocincla fuliginosa
 Wedge-billed woodcreeper, Glyphorynchus spirurus
 Northern barred-woodcreeper, Dendrocolaptes sanctithomae
 Black-banded woodcreeper, Dendrocolaptes picumnus
 Strong-billed woodcreeper, Xiphocolaptes promeropirhynchus
 Cocoa woodcreeper, Xiphorhynchus susurrans
 Ivory-billed woodcreeper, Xiphorhynchus flavigaster
 Black-striped woodcreeper, Xiphorhynchus lachrymosus
 Spotted woodcreeper, Xiphorhynchus erythropygius
 Brown-billed scythebill, Campylorhamphus pusillus 
 Streak-headed woodcreeper, Lepidocolaptes souleyetii
 Spot-crowned woodcreeper, Lepidocolaptes affinis
 Plain xenops, Xenops minutus
 Streaked xenops, Xenops rutilans
 Buffy tuftedcheek, Pseudocolaptes lawrencii
 Buff-fronted foliage-gleaner, Dendroma rufa
 Scaly-throated foliage-gleaner, Anabacerthia variegaticeps
 Lineated foliage-gleaner, Syndactyla subalaris
 Ruddy foliage-gleaner, Clibanornis rubiginosus
 Streak-breasted treehunter, Thripadectes rufobrunneus (E-R)
 Buff-throated foliage-gleaner, Automolus ochrolaemus
 Chiriqui foliage-gleaner, Automolus exsertus (E-R)
 Striped woodhaunter, Automolus subulatus
 Spotted barbtail, Premnoplex brunnescens
 Ruddy treerunner, Margarornis rubiginosus (E-R)
 Red-faced spinetail, Cranioleuca erythrops
 Pale-breasted spinetail, Synallaxis albescens
 Slaty spinetail, Synallaxis brachyura

Vireos, shrike-babblers, and erpornis

Order: PasseriformesFamily: Vireonidae

The vireos are a group of small to medium-sized passerine birds. They are typically greenish in color and resemble wood warblers apart from their heavier bills.

 Rufous-browed peppershrike, Cyclarhis gujanensis
 Scrub greenlet, Hylophilus flavipes
 Green shrike-vireo, Vireolanius pulchellus
 Tawny-crowned greenlet, Tunchiornis ochraceiceps
 Lesser greenlet, Pachysylvia decurtata
 White-eyed vireo, Vireo griseus
 Mangrove vireo, Vireo pallens
 Yellow-throated vireo, Vireo flavifrons
 Yellow-winged vireo, Vireo carmioli (E-R)
 Blue-headed vireo, Vireo solitarius
 Philadelphia vireo, Vireo philadelphicus
 Warbling vireo, Vireo gilvus
 Brown-capped vireo, Vireo leucophrys
 Red-eyed vireo, Vireo olivaceus
 Yellow-green vireo, Vireo flavoviridis
 Black-whiskered vireo, Vireo altiloquus

Crows, jays, and magpies

Order: PasseriformesFamily: Corvidae

The family Corvidae includes crows, ravens, jays, choughs, magpies, treepies, nutcrackers, and ground jays. Corvids are above average in size among the Passeriformes, and some of the larger species show high levels of intelligence.

 Silvery-throated jay, Cyanolyca argentigula (E-R)
 Azure-hooded jay, Cyanolyca cucullata
 White-throated magpie-jay, Calocitta formosa
 Brown jay, Psilorhinus morio
 Black-chested jay, Cyanocorax affinis

Swallows

Order: PasseriformesFamily: Hirundinidae

The family Hirundinidae is adapted to aerial feeding. They have a slender streamlined body, long pointed wings, and a short bill with a wide gape. The feet are adapted to perching rather than walking, and the front toes are partially joined at the base.

 Bank swallow, Riparia riparia
 Tree swallow, Tachycineta bicolor
 Violet-green swallow, Tachycineta thalassina
 Mangrove swallow, Tachycineta albilinea
 Blue-and-white swallow, Pygochelidon cyanoleuca
 Northern rough-winged swallow, Stelgidopteryx serripennis
 Southern rough-winged swallow, Stelgidopteryx ruficollis
 Brown-chested martin, Progne tapera
 Purple martin, Progne subis
 Sinaloa martin, Progne sinaloae (A)
 Gray-breasted martin, Progne chalybea
 Southern martin, Progne elegans (A)
 Barn swallow, Hirundo rustica
 Cliff swallow, Petrochelidon pyrrhonota
 Cave swallow, Petrochelidon fulva (A)

Waxwings
Order: PasseriformesFamily: Bombycillidae

The waxwings are a group of birds with soft silky plumage and unique red tips to some of the wing feathers. In the Bohemian and cedar waxwings, these tips look like sealing wax and give the group its name. These are arboreal birds of northern forests. They live on insects in summer and berries in winter.

 Cedar waxwing, Bombycilla cedrorum

Silky-flycatchers

Order: PasseriformesFamily: Ptiliogonatidae

The silky-flycatchers are a small family of passerine birds which occur mainly in Central America, although the range of one species extends to central California. They are related to waxwings and like that group have soft silky plumage, usually gray or pale yellow. They have small crests.

 Black-and-yellow silky-flycatcher, Phainoptila melanoxantha (E-R)
 Long-tailed silky-flycatcher, Ptiliogonys caudatus (E-R)

Gnatcatchers
Order: PasseriformesFamily: Polioptilidae

These dainty birds resemble Old World warblers in their build and habits, moving restlessly through the foliage seeking insects. The gnatcatchers and gnatwrens are mainly soft bluish gray in color and have the typical insectivore's long sharp bill. They are birds of fairly open woodland or scrub, which nest in bushes or trees.

 Long-billed gnatwren, Ramphocaenus melanurus
 Tawny-faced gnatwren, Microbates cinereiventris
 White-browed gnatcatcher, Polioptila bilineata
 White-lored gnatcatcher, Polioptila albiloris

Wrens

Order: PasseriformesFamily: Troglodytidae

The wrens are mainly small and inconspicuous except for their loud songs. These birds have short wings and thin down-turned bills. Several species often hold their tails upright. All are insectivorous.

 Rock wren, Salpinctes obsoletus
 Nightingale wren, Microcerculus philomela
 Scaly-breasted wren, Microcerculus marginatus
 House wren, Troglodytes aedon
 Ochraceous wren, Troglodytes ochraceus (E-R)
 Timberline wren, Thryorchilus browni (E-R)
 Grass wren, Cistothorus platensis
 Band-backed wren, Campylorhynchus zonatus
 Rufous-naped wren, Campylorhynchus rufinucha
 Black-throated wren, Pheugopedius atrogularis
 Rufous-breasted wren, Pheugopedius rutilus
 Spot-breasted wren, Pheugopedius maculipectus
 Black-bellied wren, Pheugopedius fasciatoventris
 Rufous-and-white wren, Thryophilus rufalbus
 Banded wren, Thryophilus pleurostictus
 Stripe-breasted wren, Cantorchilus thoracicus
 Cabanis's wren, Cantorchilus modestus
 Canebrake wren, Cantorchilus zeledoni
 Isthmian wren, Cantorchilus elutus (E-R)
 Bay wren, Cantorchilus nigricapillus
 Riverside wren, Cantorchilus semibadius (E-R)
 White-breasted wood-wren, Henicorhina leucosticta
 Gray-breasted wood-wren, Henicorhina leucophrys
 Song wren, Cyphorhinus phaeocephalus

Mockingbirds and thrashers
Order: PasseriformesFamily: Mimidae

The mimids are a family of passerine birds that includes thrashers, mockingbirds, tremblers, and the New World catbirds. These birds are notable for their vocalizations, especially their ability to mimic a wide variety of birds and other sounds heard outdoors. Their coloring tends towards dull-grays and browns.

 Gray catbird, Dumetella carolinensis
 Tropical mockingbird, Mimus gilvus
 Northern mockingbird, Mimus polyglottos (A)

Dippers
Order: PasseriformesFamily: Cinclidae

Dippers are a group of perching birds whose habitat includes aquatic environments in the Americas, Europe, and Asia. They are named for their bobbing or dipping movements.

 American dipper, Cinclus mexicanus

Thrushes and allies

Order: PasseriformesFamily: Turdidae

The thrushes are a group of passerine birds that occur mainly in the Old World. They are plump, soft plumaged, small to medium-sized insectivores or sometimes omnivores, often feeding on the ground. Many have attractive songs.

 Black-faced solitaire, Myadestes melanops (E-R)
 Black-billed nightingale-thrush, Catharus gracilirostris (E-R)
 Orange-billed nightingale-thrush, Catharus aurantiirostris
 Slaty-backed nightingale-thrush, Catharus fuscater
 Ruddy-capped nightingale-thrush, Catharus frantzii
 Black-headed nightingale-thrush, Catharus mexicanus
 Veery, Catharus fuscescens
 Gray-cheeked thrush, Catharus minimus
 Swainson's thrush, Catharus ustulatus
 Wood thrush, Hylocichla mustelina
 Sooty thrush, Turdus nigrescens (E-R)
 Mountain thrush, Turdus plebejus
 Pale-vented thrush, Turdus obsoletus
 Clay-colored thrush, Turdus grayi
 White-throated thrush, Turdus assimilis

Waxbills and allies
Order: PasseriformesFamily: Estrildidae

The estrildid finches are small passerine birds of the Old World tropics and Australasia. They are gregarious and often colonial seed eaters with short thick but pointed bills. They are all similar in structure and habits, but have wide variation in plumage colors and patterns.

 Tricolored munia, Lonchura malacca (I)

Old World sparrows
Order: PasseriformesFamily: Passeridae

Sparrows are small passerine birds. In general, sparrows tend to be small, plump, brown or gray birds with short tails and short powerful beaks. Sparrows are seed eaters, but they also consume small insects.

 House sparrow, Passer domesticus (I)

Wagtails and pipits
Order: PasseriformesFamily: Motacillidae

Motacillidae is a family of small passerine birds with medium to long tails. They include the wagtails, longclaws, and pipits. They are slender ground-feeding insectivores of open country.

 American pipit, Anthus rubescens (A)

Finches, euphonias, and allies

Order: PasseriformesFamily: Fringillidae

Finches are seed-eating passerine birds, that are small to moderately large and have a strong beak, usually conical and in some species very large. All have twelve tail feathers and nine primaries. These birds have a bouncing flight with alternating bouts of flapping and gliding on closed wings, and most sing well.

 Elegant euphonia, Chlorophonia elegantissima
 Golden-browed chlorophonia, Chlorophonia callophrys (E-R)
 Scrub euphonia, Euphonia affinis
 Yellow-crowned euphonia, Euphonia luteicapilla
 White-vented euphonia, Euphonia minuta
 Yellow-throated euphonia, Euphonia hirundinacea
 Thick-billed euphonia, Euphonia laniirostris
 Spot-crowned euphonia, Euphonia imitans (E-R)
 Olive-backed euphonia, Euphonia gouldi
 Tawny-capped euphonia, Euphonia anneae
 Yellow-bellied siskin, Spinus xanthogastra
 Lesser goldfinch, Spinus psaltria

Thrush-tanager
Order: PasseriformesFamily: Rhodinocichlidae

This species was historically placed in family Thraupidae. It was placed in its own family in 2017.

 Rosy thrush-tanager, Rhodinocichla rosea

New World sparrows

Order: PasseriformesFamily: Passerellidae

Until 2017, these species were considered part of the family Emberizidae. Most of the species are known as sparrows, but these birds are not closely related to the Old World sparrows which are in the family Passeridae. Many of these have distinctive head patterns.

 Ashy-throated chlorospingus, Chlorospingus canigularis
 Sooty-capped chlorospingus, Chlorospingus pileatus (E-R)
 Common chlorospingus, Chlorospingus flavopectus
 Stripe-headed sparrow, Peucaea ruficauda
 Botteri's sparrow, Peucaea botterii
 Grasshopper sparrow, Ammodramus savannarum
 Olive sparrow, Arremonops rufivirgatus
 Black-striped sparrow, Arremonops conirostris
 Lark sparrow, Chondestes grammacus
 Chipping sparrow, Spizella passerina (A)
 Clay-colored sparrow, Spizella pallida (A)
 Costa Rican brushfinch, Arremon costaricensis (E-R)
 Orange-billed sparrow, Arremon aurantiirostris
 Chestnut-capped brushfinch, Arremon brunneinucha
 Sooty-faced finch, Arremon crassirostris (E-R)
 Volcano junco, Junco vulcani (E-R)
 Rufous-collared sparrow, Zonotrichia capensis
 White-crowned sparrow, Zonotrichia leucophrys (A)
 Savannah sparrow, Passerculus sandwichensis (A)
 Lincoln's sparrow, Melospiza lincolnii
 Large-footed finch, Pezopetes capitalis (E-R)
 White-eared ground-sparrow, Melozone leucotis
 Cabanis's ground-sparrow, Melozone cabanisi (E)
 Rusty sparrow, Aimophila rufescens
 White-naped brushfinch, Atlapetes albinucha
 Yellow-thighed brushfinch, Atlapetes tibialis (E-R)

Wrenthrush
Order: PasseriformesFamily: Zeledoniidae

Despite its name, this species is neither a wren nor a thrush, and is not closely related to either family. It was moved from the New World warblers (Parulidae) and placed in its own family in 2017.

 Wrenthrush, Zeledonia coronata (E-R)

Yellow-breasted chat
Order: PasseriformesFamily: Icteriidae

This species was historically placed in the New World warblers but nonetheless most authorities were unsure if it belonged there. It was placed in its own family in 2017.

 Yellow-breasted chat, Icteria virens

Troupials and allies

Order: PasseriformesFamily: Icteridae

The icterids are a group of small to medium-sized, often colorful, passerine birds restricted to the New World and include the grackles, New World blackbirds, and New World orioles. Most species have black as the predominant plumage color, often enlivened by yellow, orange, or red.

 Yellow-headed blackbird, Xanthocephalus xanthocephalus (A)
 Bobolink, Dolichonyx oryzivorus
 Eastern meadowlark, Sturnella magna
 Red-breasted meadowlark, Leistes militaris
 Yellow-billed cacique, Amblycercus holosericeus
 Crested oropendola, Psarocolius decumanus
 Chestnut-headed oropendola, Psarocolius wagleri
 Montezuma oropendola, Psarocolius montezuma
 Scarlet-rumped cacique, Cacicus uropygialis
 Black-cowled oriole, Icterus prosthemelas
 Orchard oriole, Icterus spurius
 Yellow-backed oriole, Icterus chrysater (A)
 Yellow-tailed oriole, Icterus mesomelas'
 Streak-backed oriole, Icterus pustulatus Bullock's oriole, Icterus bullockii (A)
 Spot-breasted oriole, Icterus pectoralis Baltimore oriole, Icterus galbula Red-winged blackbird, Agelaius phoeniceus Shiny cowbird, Molothrus bonariensis Bronzed cowbird, Molothrus aeneus Giant cowbird, Molothrus oryzivorus Melodious blackbird, Dives dives Great-tailed grackle, Quiscalus mexicanus Nicaraguan grackle, Quiscalus nicaraguensisNew World warblers

Order: PasseriformesFamily: Parulidae

The New World warblers are a group of small, often colorful, passerine birds restricted to the New World. Most are arboreal, but some are terrestrial. Most members of this family are insectivores.

 Ovenbird, Seiurus aurocapilla Worm-eating warbler, Helmitheros vermivorum Louisiana waterthrush, Parkesia motacilla Northern waterthrush, Parkesia noveboracensis Golden-winged warbler, Vermivora chrysoptera Blue-winged warbler, Vermivora cyanoptera Black-and-white warbler, Mniotilta varia Prothonotary warbler, Protonotaria citrea Flame-throated warbler, Leiothlypis gutturalis (E-R)
 Tennessee warbler, Leiothlypis peregrina Orange-crowned warbler, Leiothlypis celata Nashville warbler, Leiothlypis ruficapilla Connecticut warbler, Oporornis agilis (A)
 Gray-crowned yellowthroat, Geothlypis poliocephala MacGillivray's warbler, Geothlypis tolmiei Mourning warbler, Geothlypis philadelphia Kentucky warbler, Geothlypis formosa Olive-crowned yellowthroat, Geothlypis semiflava Common yellowthroat, Geothlypis trichas Hooded warbler, Setophaga citrina American redstart, Setophaga ruticilla Cape May warbler, Setophaga tigrina Cerulean warbler, Setophaga cerulea (vulnerable)
 Northern parula, Setophaga americana Tropical parula, Setophaga pitiayumi Magnolia warbler, Setophaga magnolia  Bay-breasted warbler, Setophaga castanea Blackburnian warbler, Setophaga fusca Yellow warbler, Setophaga petechia Chestnut-sided warbler, Setophaga pensylvanica Blackpoll warbler, Setophaga striata Black-throated blue warbler, Setophaga caerulescens Palm warbler, Setophaga palmarum Pine warbler, Setophaga pinus Yellow-rumped warbler, Setophaga coronata Yellow-throated warbler, Setophaga dominica Prairie warbler, Setophaga discolor Townsend's warbler, Setophaga townsendi Hermit warbler, Setophaga occidentalis Golden-cheeked warbler, Setophaga chrysoparia  (endangered)
 Black-throated green warbler, Setophaga virens Buff-rumped warbler, Myiothlypis fulvicauda Chestnut-capped warbler, Basileuterus delattrii Black-cheeked warbler, Basileuterus melanogenys (E-R)
 Golden-crowned warbler, Basileuterus culicivorus Costa Rican warbler, Basileuterus melanotis (E-R)
 Canada warbler, Cardellina canadensis Wilson's warbler, Cardellina pusilla Slate-throated redstart, Myioborus miniatus Collared redstart, Myioborus torquatus (E-R)

Cardinals and allies
Order: PasseriformesFamily: Cardinalidae

The cardinals are a family of robust, seed-eating birds with strong bills. They are typically associated with open woodland. The sexes usually have distinct plumages.

 Hepatic tanager, Piranga flava Summer tanager, Piranga rubra Scarlet tanager, Piranga olivacea Western tanager, Piranga ludoviciana Flame-colored tanager, Piranga bidentata White-winged tanager, Piranga leucoptera Red-crowned ant-tanager, Habia rubica Red-throated ant-tanager, Habia fuscicauda Black-cheeked ant-tanager, Habia atrimaxillaris (E) (endangered)
 Carmiol's tanager, Chlorothraupis carmioli Black-faced grosbeak, Caryothraustes poliogaster Black-thighed grosbeak, Pheucticus tibialis (E-R)
 Rose-breasted grosbeak, Pheucticus ludovicianus Black-headed grosbeak, Pheucticus melanocephalus (A)
 Blue seedeater, Amaurospiza concolor Blue-black grosbeak, Cyanoloxia cyanoides Blue bunting, Cyanocompsa parellina (A)
 Blue grosbeak, Passerina caerulea Indigo bunting, Passerina cyanea Painted bunting, Passerina ciris Dickcissel, Spiza americanaMicrospingid tanagers
Order: PasseriformesFamily: Mitrospingidae

The members of this small family were previously included in Thraupidae ("true" tanagers). They were placed in this new family in 2017.

 Dusky-faced tanager, Mitrospingus cassiniiTanagers and allies
Order: PasseriformesFamily: Thraupidae

The tanagers are a large group of small to medium-sized passerine birds restricted to the New World, mainly in the tropics. Many species are brightly colored. As a family they are omnivorous, but individual species specialize in eating fruits, seeds, insects, or other types of food. Most have short, rounded wings.

 Blue-and-gold tanager, Bangsia arcaei (E-R)
 Speckled tanager, Ixothraupis guttata Blue-gray tanager, Thraupis episcopus Yellow-winged tanager, Thraupis abbas (R?)
 Palm tanager, Thraupis palmarum Golden-hooded tanager, Stilpnia larvata Spangle-cheeked tanager, Tangara dowii (E-R)
 Plain-colored tanager, Tangara inornata Rufous-winged tanager, Tangara lavinia Bay-headed tanager, Tangara gyrola Flame-faced tanager, Tangara parzudakii (A)
 Emerald tanager, Tangara florida Silver-throated tanager, Tangara icterocephala Swallow tanager, Tersina viridis (A)
 Grassland yellow-finch, Sicalis luteola (A)
 Slaty finch, Haplospiza rustica Peg-billed finch, Acanthidops bairdi (E-R)
 Slaty flowerpiercer, Diglossa plumbea (E-R)
 Green honeycreeper, Chlorophanes spiza Black-and-yellow tanager, Chrysothlypis chrysomelas (E-R)
 Sulphur-rumped tanager, Heterospingus rubrifrons (E-R)
 Blue-black grassquit, Volatinia jacarina Gray-headed tanager, Eucometis penicillata White-shouldered tanager, Loriotus luctuosus Tawny-crested tanager, Tachyphonus delattrii White-lined tanager, Tachyphonus rufus White-throated shrike-tanager, Lanio leucothorax Crimson-collared tanager, Ramphocelus sanguinolentus Flame-rumped tanager, Ramphocelus flammigerus (A)
 Scarlet-rumped tanager, Ramphocelus passerinii Crimson-backed tanager, Ramphocelus dimidiatus (A)
 Shining honeycreeper, Cyanerpes lucidus Red-legged honeycreeper, Cyanerpes cyaneus Scarlet-thighed dacnis, Dacnis venusta Blue dacnis, Dacnis cayana Bananaquit, Coereba flaveola Yellow-faced grassquit, Tiaris olivaceus Cocos finch, Pinaroloxias inornata (E) (vulnerable)
 Lesson's seedeater, Sporophila bouvronides (A)
 Lined seedeater, Sporophila lineola (A)
 Thick-billed seed-finch, Sporophila funerea Nicaraguan seed-finch, Sporophila nuttingi Variable seedeater, Sporophila corvina Slate-colored seedeater, Sporophila schistacea Morelet's seedeater, Sporophila morelleti Yellow-bellied seedeater, Sporophila nigricollis Ruddy-breasted seedeater, Sporophila minuta Wedge-tailed grass-finch, Emberizoides herbicola Black-headed saltator, Saltator atriceps Buff-throated saltator, Saltator maximus Slate-colored grosbeak, Saltator grossus Cinnamon-bellied saltator, Saltator grandis Blue-gray saltator, Saltator coerulescens Streaked saltator, Saltator striatipectus''

See also
List of amphibians of Costa Rica
List of birds
Lists of birds by region
List of mammals of Costa Rica
List of non-marine molluscs of Costa Rica
List of reptiles of Costa Rica

References

External links
Birdlist.org: Birds of Costa Rica - World Institute for Conservation and Environment
 https://listaoficialavesdecostarica.wordpress.com/

'
birds
Costa Rica
Costa Rica